Alexander Addison was born on 29 September 1877 in Adelaide, Australia and died on 12 October 1935 in Double Bay, New South Wales. He was an Australian cricketer. He played one first-class match for Tasmania in 1903.

See also
 List of Tasmanian representative cricketers

References

External links
 

1877 births
1935 deaths
Australian cricketers
Tasmania cricketers
Cricketers from Adelaide